Kaveh Pahlavan ( born in Tehran,  Pahlavi Iran), is a Professor of Electrical and Computer Engineering and Computer Science and the director of the Center for Wireless Information Network Studies (CWINS), Worcester Polytechnic Institute, Worcester, Massachusetts. Pahlavan is considered the father of Wi-Fi technology by his friends and colleagues, wireless indoor geolocation, and Body Area Networking.  He started doing research on Wi-Fi when it was in its infancy.

He has contributed to numerous technical publications and holds patents in these areas.  His current area of research is opportunistic application of RF signals from wireless devices for gesture and motion detection as well as authentication and security.

Education and Career
Pahlavan received his BS/MS degree in Electrical Engineering from the University of Tehran in 1975, and his PhD degree from the Worcester Polytechnic Institute, Worcester, Massachusetts in 1979. He began his academic career as an assistant Professor at the Northeastern University, Boston, MA in 1979, then he joined the faculty at the Worcester Polytechnic Institute in 1985. At WPI he founded the world's first academic research program in wireless local area networks (WLAN), commercially known as Wi-Fi (1985),. He has been a visiting Professor at the University of Oulu, Finland (1995-2007), where he also spent his sabbatical leave in 1999. He has spent his other sabbatical leaves at the Olin College and Harvard University in 2004 and 2011 respectively. He was the Chief Technical Adviser of Skyhook Wireless, Boston, MA between 2004 and 2014. WINDATA was one of the pioneers in design of WLAN and Skyhook is the pioneer of Wi-Fi positioning systems, which was adopted by Steve Jobs for the original iPhone (2007). Throughout several decades of research and scholarship, he has also served as a consultant to many key players in the wireless industry including Nokia, Apple, DEC, Honeywell, Electrobit, JPL and NTT. He has also led the US team for review of the National R&D Programs, sponsored by the Finnish Academy and TEKES (2000, 2003). Pahlavan is widely recognized as the inventor of Wi-Fi, and Body Area Networks by his friends and colleagues. He was elected as a fellow of the IEEE (1996), was selected as a member of the Evolution of Untethered Communications Committee, National Research Council (1997), was the first Fulbright-Nokia scholar (2000), and was awarded the WPI's Board of Trustees' Outstanding Research and Creative Scholarship Award (2011).

Pahlavan is the founding Editor-in-Chief of the International Journal of Wireless Information Networks, a member of the advisory board of the IEEE Wireless Communications.

Books
Pahlavan has co-authored several books including:
 Understanding Communications Networks – for Emerging Cybernetics Applications Forthcoming, Kaveh Pahlavan, River Publishers, the Netherlands, 612 pages, March 2021.
 Indoor Geolocation Science and Technology At the Emergence of Smart World and IoT, K. Pahlavan, River Publishers, the Netherlands, 471 pages, Hardcover, January 2019.
 Principles of Wireless Access and Localization, K. Pahlavan and P Krishnamurthy, John Wiley and Sons, 720 pages, November 2013.
 Networking Fundamentals – Personal, Local and Wide Area Communications, K. Pahlavan and P. Krishnamurthy, John Wiley and Sons, Hardcover, 638 pages, March 2009.
 Wireless Information Networks - 2nd Edition, K. Pahlavan and Allen H. Levesque,Wiley - Interscience, Hardcover, 722 pages, September 2005.
 Principles of Wireless Networks - A Unified Approach, K. Pahlavan and P. Krishnamurthy, Prentice Hall, Hardcover, 584 pages, January 2002.
 Wireless Information Networks, K. Pahlavan and A. Levesque, John Wiley and Sons, Hardcover, 572 pages, April 1995.
 R&D Programmes in Electronics and Telecommunication, ETX, TLX, INWITE and Telectronics, A. Salo, K. Pahlavan, and J.P. Salmenkaita Academy of Finland and TEKES, 2000
 Wireless Network Deployments (edited book), R. Ganesh and K. Pahlavan ,Kluwer Academic Publishers, 2000
 Broadband Satellite Communications for Internet Access Sastri L. Kota , Kaveh Pahlavan , Pentti A. Leppänen, Springer, 1 edition (November 1, 2003), Hardcover 456 pages
 Emerging Location Aware Broadband Wireless Ad Hoc Networks, Rajamani Ganesh , S. L. Kota, Kaveh Pahlavan, Springer, October 2004 329 pages, 
 The Evolution of Untethered Communications, K. Pahlavan (committee member), National Academy Press, 1997 (committee report), 
 Wireless Multimedia Network Technologies (edited book), R. Ganesh, K. Pahlavan and Z. Zvonar, Kluwer Academic Publisher, 1999,

Personal life
In Iran, as a student, he played in the University of Tehran Volleyball Team, which won two Iranian National Volleyball College Championships (1971 and 1972). In 1973, sponsored by the University of Tehran, he participated in the College Student's Olympics, Moscow, USSR. His team lost every important match except those played against Soviet Union female Volleyball team.  He also played for Peykan/Shahbaz Volleyball Club (1969–72), ranked on top five first class Iranian National Volleyball League, and for that he was invited to the Iranian National Volleyball Team in 1972. In the United States he received an award in Argentine Tango Dancing with his wife (2011–present). He studies history, philosophy, and Persian poetry as hobby. In 2011, he managed English translation and youtube posting of Behrouz Gharibpour's musical masterpiece, "Puppet Opera of Rumi". Kaveh and his life partner Farzaneh have a daughter, son, and 3 grandchildren. His son-in-law is from Ivory Coast.  In this light, Kaveh Pahlavan is widely recognized as multicultural and loved by his colleagues a WPI.

See also
 List of Iranian Americans
 Modern Iranian scientists, scholars, and engineers
 Worcester Polytechnic Institute

References

External links
 Center for Wireless Information Network Studies (CWINS)

American people of Iranian descent
Iranian engineers
Iranian expatriate academics
People from Tehran
1951 births
Living people
Worcester Polytechnic Institute faculty
University of Tehran alumni
21st-century American engineers